The curie (symbol Ci) is a non-SI unit of radioactivity originally defined in 1910. According to a notice in Nature at the time, it was to be named in honour of Pierre Curie, but was considered at least by some to be in honour of Marie Skłodowska–Curie as well, and is in later literature considered to be named for both.

It was originally defined as "the quantity or mass of radium emanation in equilibrium with one gram of radium (element)", but is currently defined as 1 Ci =  decays per second after more accurate measurements of the activity of 226Ra (which has a specific activity of ).

In 1975 the General Conference on Weights and Measures gave the becquerel (Bq), defined as one nuclear decay per second, official status as the SI unit of activity. 
Therefore:
 1 Ci =  = 37 GBq 
and
 1 Bq ≅  ≅ 27 pCi

While its continued use is discouraged by National Institute of Standards and Technology (NIST) and other bodies, the curie is still widely used throughout government, industry and medicine in the United States and in other countries.

At the 1910 meeting, which originally defined the curie, it was proposed to make it equivalent to 10 nanograms of radium (a practical amount). But Marie Curie, after initially accepting this, changed her mind and insisted on one gram of radium. According to Bertram Boltwood, Marie Curie thought that "the use of the name 'curie' for so infinitesimally small [a] quantity of anything was altogether inappropriate".

The power emitted in radioactive decay corresponding to one curie can be calculated by multiplying the decay energy by approximately 5.93 mW/MeV.

A radiotherapy machine may have roughly 1000 Ci of a radioisotope such as caesium-137 or cobalt-60. This quantity of radioactivity can produce serious health effects with only a few minutes of close-range, unshielded exposure.

Radioactive decay can lead to the emission of particulate radiation or electromagnetic radiation. Ingesting even small quantities of some particulate emitting radionuclides may be fatal. For example, the median lethal dose (LD-50) for ingested polonium-210 is 240 μCi; about 53.5 nanograms. Although, millicurie quantities of electromagnetic emitting radionuclides are routinely used in Nuclear Medicine.

The typical human body contains roughly 0.1 μCi (14 mg) of naturally occurring potassium-40. A human body containing 16 kg of carbon (see Composition of the human body) would also have about 24 nanograms or 0.1 μCi of carbon-14. Together, these would result in a total of approximately 0.2 μCi or 7400 decays per second inside the person's body (mostly from beta decay but some from gamma decay).

As a measure of quantity
Units of activity (the curie and the becquerel) also refer to a quantity of radioactive atoms. Because the probability of decay is a fixed physical quantity, for a known number of atoms of a particular radionuclide, a predictable number will decay in a given time.  The number of decays that will occur in one second in one gram of atoms of a particular radionuclide is known as the specific activity of that radionuclide.

The activity of a sample decreases with time because of decay.

The rules of radioactive decay may be used to convert activity to an actual number of atoms. They state that 1 Ci of radioactive atoms would follow the expression
 N (atoms) × λ (s−1) = 1 Ci = 3.7 × 1010 Bq,
and so
 N = 3.7 × 1010 Bq / λ,
where λ is the decay constant in s−1.

We can also express activity in moles:

where NA is the Avogadro constant, and t1/2 is the half-life. The number of moles may be converted to grams by multiplying by the atomic mass.

Here are some examples, ordered by half-life:

Radiation related quantities
The following table shows radiation quantities in SI and non-SI units:

See also
Geiger counter
Ionizing radiation
Radiation exposure
Radiation poisoning
Radiation burn
United Nations Scientific Committee on the Effects of Atomic Radiation

References

Non-SI metric units
Radioactivity
Units of radioactivity
Pierre Curie